Mecidiye is a village in the Erzincan District of Erzincan Province in Turkey.

References

Villages in Erzincan District